Clifford Wilson  (1906–1997) was a British nephrologist and professor of medicine.

Biography
After education at Heath Grammar School in Halifax, Clifford Wilson studied at Balliol College, Oxford, graduating with a first in natural sciences. He then studied medicine at the London Hospital. He qualified MRCS, LRCP in 1931. He graduated BM BCh Oxon in 1933. In 1934, by means of a Rockefeller travelling scholarship, he went to Harvard Medical School, where he worked with the pathologist Paul Kimmelstiel.

Wilson returned to the London Hospital. He graduated DM in 1936. In 1938 he became assistant director of the London Hospital's academic medical unit with Arthur Ellis as the director.

During WWII Wilson served in the RAMC's medical research section and helped to deal with outbreaks of viral hepatitis in the military. In 1946 he succeeded Arthur Ellis as professor of medicine at the University of London. Wilson, with Michael Floyer, Jack Ledingham, and the pathologist Frank Byrom, worked with rats to show how a vicious circle of hypertension can develop — renal damage can cause hypertension, which in turn can cause arteriolar lesions with increased renal damage.

Wilson was elected FRCP in 1951. He was professor of medicine at the University of London (at the London Hospital) from 1946 to 1971, when he retired as professor emeritus. There he was dean of the faculty of medicine from 1968 to 1971 and director of the academic medical unit from 1946 to 1971. He was president of the Renal Association in 1963–1964. In 1967 he gave the Bradshaw Lecture on The cause and prognosis of the nephrotic syndrome.
 
In 1936 Clifford Wilson married Kathleen Hebden. They had a son and a daughter.

Selected publications
with Ensor Roslyn Holiday: 
with Paul Kimmelstiel: 
with Paul Kimmelstiel: 
with Myron Prinzmetal: 
with M. R. Pollock and A. D. Harris: 

with J. M. Ledingham:

References

1906 births
1997 deaths
20th-century British medical doctors
British nephrologists
People educated at Heath Grammar School
Alumni of Balliol College, Oxford
People from Halifax, West Yorkshire